Country Code: +380
International Call Prefix: 0~0
Trunk Prefix: 0~

Zone 3

31 – Zakarpattia Oblast
31(2) – Uzhorod
312 – Chop
3131 – Mukacheve
3132 – Rakhiv
3133 – Svalyava
3134 – Tyachiv
3135 – Velykyy Bereznyy
3136 – Volovets
3141 – Berehove
3142 – Khust
3143 – Vynohradiv
3144 – Irshava
3145 – Perechyn
3146 – Mizhhirya

32 – Lviv Oblast
32(2) – Lviv
3230 – Pustomyty
3231 – Horodok
3234 – Mostytska
3236 – Sambir
3238 – Staryy Sambir
3239 – Zhydachiv
3241 – Mykolayiv
3244 – Drohobych
3245 – Stryy
3247 – Truskavets
3248 – Boryslav
3249 – Chervonohrad
3251 – Skole
3252 – Zhovkva
3254 – Kamyanka-Buzka
3255 – Radekhiv
3256 – Novoyavorivsk
3257 – Sokal
3259 – Yavoriv
3264 – Busk
3260 – Morshyn
3263 – Peremyshlyany
3265 – Zolochiv
3266 – Brody
3269 – Turka

33 – Volyn Oblast
33(2) – Lutsk
3342 – Volodymyr-Volynskyy
3344 – Novovolynsk
3346 – Stara Vyzhivka
3352 – Kovel
3355 – Shatsk
3357 – Kamin-Kashyrskyy
3362 – Lyubeshiv
3363 – Turiysk
3365 – Kivertsi, Tsuman
3366 – Ratne
3368 – Rozhyshche
3372 – Ivanychi
3374 – Lokachi
3376 – Manevychi
3377 – Lyuboml
3379 – Horokhiv

34 – Ivano-Frankivsk Oblast
34(2) – Ivano-Frankivsk
3430 – Horodenka
3431 – Halych
3432 – Verkhovyna
3433 – Kolomyya
3434 – Yaremche
3435 – Rohatyn
3436 – Tysmenytsia
3437 – Bolehiv
3438 – Burshtyn
3471 – Bohorodchany, Solotvyno
3472 – Kalush
3474 – Rozhnyativ
3475 – Nadvirna
3476 – Snyatyn, Zabolotiv
3477 – Dolyna
3478 – Kosiv
3479 – Tlumach

35 – Ternopil Oblast
35(2) – Ternopil
3540 – Zboriv
3541 – Borshchiv
3542 – Pidhaytsi 
3543 – Pidvolochynsk
3544 – Buchach
3546 – Kremenets
3547 – Kozliv, Kozova
3548 – Berezhany
3549 – Lanivtsi
3550 – Zbarazh
3551 – Terebovlya
3552 – Chortkiv
3554 – Zalishchyky
3555 – Monastyrska
3557 – Husyatyn
3558 – Shumske

36 – Rivne Oblast
36(2) – Rivne
3632 – Zarichne
3633 – Radyvyliv
3634 – Volodymyrets
3635 – Rokytne
3636 – Varash
3650 – Hoshcha
3651 – Korets
3652 – Zdolbuniv
3653 – Berezne
3654 – Ostroh
3655 – Sarny
3656 – Dubno
3657 – Kostopil
3658 – Dubrovytsia
3659 – Mlyniv

37 – Chernivtsi Oblast
37(2) – Chernivtsi
3730 – Vyzhnytsia
37312 – Khotyn
3732 – Kelmentsi
3733 – Novoselytsia
3734 – Hlyboka
3735 – Storozhynets
3736 – Kitsman
3737 – Zastavna
3738 – Putyla
3739 – Sokyryany

38 – Khmelnytskyi Oblast
38(2) – Khmelnytskyi
3840 – Shepetivka
3841 – Bilohirya
3842 – Slavuta
3843 – Polonne
3844 – Teofipol
3845 – Volochysk
3846 – Vinkyvtsi
3847 – Nova Ushytsia
3848 – Netishyn
3849 – Kamyanets-Podilskyy
3850 – Stara Synyava
3851 – Horodok
3852 – Izyaslav
3853 – Yarmolyntsi
3854 – Starokostyantyniv
3855 – Krasyliv
3856 – Derazhnya
3857 – Letychiv
3858 – Dunayivtsi
3859 – Chemerivtsi

Zone 4

41 – Zhytomyr Oblast
41(2) – Zhytomyr
4130 – Korostyshiv
4131 – Chervonoarmiysk
4132 – Radomyshl
4133 – Malyn
4134 – Chernyakhiv
4135 – Olevsk
4136 – Andrushivka
4137 – Popilnya
4138 – Ruzhyn
4139 – Chudniv
4140 – Narodychi
4141 – Novohrad-Volynskyy
4142 – Korosten
4143 – Berdychiv
4144 – Baranivka
4145 – Volodarsk-Volynskyy
4146 – Romanov
4147 – Lyubar
4148 – Ovruch
4149 – Yemilchyne
4161 – Luhyny
4162 – Brusyliv

43 – Vinnytsia Oblast
43(2) – Vinnytsia
4330 – Orativ
4331 – Nemyriv
4332 – Zhmerynka
4333 – Kalynivka
4334 – Haysyn
4335 – Tulchyn
4336 – Yampil
4337 – Mohyliv-Podilskyy
4338 – Khmilnyk
4340 – Kryzhopil
4341 – Bar
4342 – Kozyatyn
4343 – Ladyzhyn, Trostyanets
4344 – Sharhorod
4345 – Illintsi
4346 – Pohrebyshche
4347 – Lityn
4348 – Tomashpil
4349 – Pishchanka
4350 – Vapnyarka
4351 – Chechelnyk
4352 – Bershad
4353 – Teplyk
4355 – Hnivan, Tyvriv
4356 – Murovany Kurylyvtsi
4357 – Chernivtsi
4358 – Lypovets

44 – Kyiv
44 – Kyiv

45 – Kyiv Oblast
4560 – Tetiyiv
4561 – Bohuslav
4562 – Rokytne
4563 – Bila Tserkva
4564 – Stavyshche
4565 – Fastiv
4566 – Tarashcha
4567 – Pereyaslav-Khmelnytskyy
4568 – Skvyra
4569 – Volodarka
4570 – Zhurivka
4571 – Vasylkiv
4572 – Obukhiv
4573 – Kaharlyk
4574 – Myronivka
4575 – Yahotyn
4576 – Baryshivka
4577 – Borodyanka
4578 – Makariv
4579 – Slavutych
4591 – Ivankiv
4594 – Brovary
4595 – Boryspil
4596 – Vyshhorod
4597 – Irpin
4598 – Vyshneve

46 – Chernihiv Oblast
46(2) – Chernihiv
4631 – Nizhyn
4632 – Bobrovytsia
4633 – Ichnya
4634 – Talalayivka
4635 – Baturyn, Bakhmach
4636 – Varva
4637 – Pryluky
4639 – Sribne
4641 – Ripky
4642 – Nosivka
4643 – Kulykivka
4644 – Mena
4645 – Horodnya
4646 – Kozelets
4653 – Borzna
4654 – Snovsk
4655 – Sosnytsia
4656 – Korop
4657 – Koryukivka
4658 – Novhorod-Siverskyy
4659 – Semenivka

47 – Cherkasy Oblast
47(2) – Cherkasy
4730 – Chyhyryn
4731 – Talne
4732 – Kamyanka
4733 – Smila
4734 – Horodyshche
4735 – Korsun-Shevchenkivskyy
4736 – Kaniv
4737 – Zolotonosha
4738 – Drabiv
4739 – Chornobay
4740 – Zvenyhorodka
4741 – Shpola
4742 – Katerynopil
4744 – Uman
4745 – Khrystynivka
4746 – Monastyryshche
4747 – Zhashkiv
4748 – Mankivka
4749 – Lysyanka

48 – Odessa Oblast
48 – Odessa
4840 – Reni
4841 – Izmayil
4843 – Kiliya
4844 – Tatarbunary
4845 – Artsyz
4846 – Bolhrad
4847 – Tarutyne
4848 – Sarata
4849 – Bilhorod-Dnistrovskyy
4850 – Teplodar
4851 – Ovidiopol
4852 – Bilyaivka
4853 – Rozdilna
4854 – Ivanivka
4855 – Kominternivske
4856 – Berezivka
4857 – Mykolayivka
4858 – Shyryayeve
4859 – Velyka Mykhaylivka
4860 – Frunzivka
4861 – Okny
4862 – Podilsk
4863 – Ananiv
4864 – Lyubashivka
4865 – Savran
4866 – Balta
4867 – Kodyma
4868 – Chornomorsk

Zone 5

51 – Mykolaiv Oblast
51(2) – Mykolaiv
5131 – Bratske
5132 – Arbuzynka
5133 – Kryve Ozero
5134 – Voznesensk
5135 – Vradiyivka
5136 – Pivdennoukrayinsk
5151 – Novyy Buh
5152 – Domanivka
5153 – Berezanka
5154 – Ochakiv
5158 – Bashtanka
5159 – Yelanets
5161 – Pervomaysk
5162 – Snihurivka
5163 – Veselynove
5164 – Kazanka
5167 – Nova Odesa
5168 – Bereznihuvate

52 – Kirovohrad Oblast
52(2) – Kropyvnytskyi
5233 – Znamyanka
5234 – Dolynska
5235 – Oleksandriya
5236 – Svitlovodsk
5237 – Petrove
5238 – Onufriyivka
5239 – Ustynivka
5240 – Kompaniyivka
5241 – Novhorodka
5242 – Oleksandrivka
5250 – Vilshanka
5251 – Novoukrayinka
5252 – Holovanivsk
5253 – Dobrovelychkivka
5254 – Hayvoron
5255 – Novoarkhanhelsk
5256 – Novomyrhorod
5257 – Bobrynets
5258 – Mala Vyska
5259 – Ulyanivka

53 – Poltava Oblast
53(2) – Poltava
5340 – Chornuhy
5341 – Semenivka
5342 – Kozelshchyna
5343 – Kobelyaky
5344 – Novi Sanzhary
5345 – Velyka Bahachka
5346 – Karlivka
5347 – Chutove
5348 – Komsomolsk
5350 – Kotelva
5351 – Dykanka
5352 – Shyshaky
5353 – Zinkiv
5354 – Hadyach
5355 – Myrhorod
5356 – Lokhovytsia
5357 – Orzhytsia
5358 – Pyryatyn
5359 – Hrebinka
536 – Kremenchuk
5361 – Lubny
5362 – Khorol
5363 – Reshetylivka
5364 – Mashivka
5365 – Hlobyne

54 – Sumy Oblast
54(2) – Sumy
5442 – Putyvl
5443 – Bilopillya
5444 – Hlukhiv
5445 – Lebedyn
5446 – Okhtyrka
5447 – Konotop
5448 – Romny
5449 – Shostka
5451 – Seredyna-Buda
5452 – Lypova Dolyna
5453 – Krolevets
5454 – Buryn
5455 – Nedryhayliv
5456 – Yampil
5457 – Velyka Pysarivka
5458 – Trostyanets
5459 – Krasnopillya

55 – Kherson Oblast
55(2) – Kherson
5530 – Kalanchak
5531 – Ivanivka
5532 – Velyka Oleksandrivka
5533 – Novovorontsovka
5534 – Henichesk
5535 – Vysokopillya
5536 – Kakhovka
5537 – Skadovsk
5538 – Chaplynka
5539 – Hola Prystan
5540 – Nyzhni Sirohozy
5542 – Tsyurupynsk
5543 – Velyka Lepetykha
5544 – Hornostayivka
5545 – Verkhniy Rohachyk
5546 – Beryslav
5547 – Bilozerka
5548 – Novotroyitske
5549 – Nova Kakhovka

56 – Dnipropetrovsk Oblast
56 – Dnipro
563 – Pavlohrad
5630 – Mezhova
5631 – Petropavlivka
5633 – Pershotravensk
5634 – Petrykivka
5635 – Yuryivka
5636 – Ternivka
5638 – Pokrovske
5639 – Vasylkivka
56(4) – Kryvyi Rih
5650 – Sofiyivka
5651 – Pyatykhatky
5652 – Zhovti Vody
5653 – Vilnohirsk
5654 – Krynychky
5656 – Apostolove
5657 – Shyroke
5658 – Verkhnyodniprovsk
566 – Nikopol
5663 – Synelnykove
5665 – Marhanets
5667 – Ordzhonikidze
5668 – Tomakivka
5669 – Solone
569 – Kamianske, Novomoskovsk
5690 – Tsarychanka
5691 – Mahdalynivka

57 – Kharkiv Oblast
57 – Kharkiv
5740 – Nova Vodolaha
5741 – Vovchansk
5742 – Kupyansk
5743 – Izyum
5744 – Krasnohrad
5745 – Lozova
5746 – Chuhuyiv
5747 – Zmiyiv
5748 – Pervomayskyy
5749 – Balakliia
5750 – Dvorichna
5751 – Shevchenkove
5752 – Velykyy Burluk
5753 – Valky
5754 – Blyznyuky
5755 – Kehychivka
5756 – Krasnokutsk
5757 – Barvinkove
5758 – Bohodukhiv
5759 – Borova
5761 – Zachepylivka
5763 – Derhachi, Solonytsivka
5764 – Zolochiv

Zone 6

61 – Zaporizhzhia Oblast
61 – Zaporizhzhia
6131 – Yakymivka
6132 – Mykhaylivka
6133 – Pryazovske
6136 – Vesele
6137 – Prymorsk
6138 – Kamyanka-Dniprovska
6139 – Enerhodar
6140 – Chernihivka
6141 – Orikhiv
6143 – Vilnyansk
6144 – Novomykolayivka
6145 – Hulyaypole
6147 – Kuybysheve
6153 – Berdyansk
6156 – Velyka Bilozerka
6162 – Rozivka
6165 – Polohy
6175 – Dniprorudne, Vasylivka
6178 – Tokmak
619 – Melitopol

62 – Donetsk Oblast
62 – Donetsk
623(2) – Makiyivka
6236 – Yasynuvata
6237 – Selydove
623(9) – Krasnoarmiysk
624 – Horlivka
6243 – Velyka Novosilka
6244 – Volnovakha
6246 – Volodarske
6247 – Toretsk
6249 – Debaltseve
6252 – Yenakiyeve
6253 – Starobesheve
6254 – Torez
6255 – Shakhtarsk
6256 – Snizhne
6257 – Khartsyzk
6259 – Amvrosiyivka
6261 – Kirovske, Lyman
626(2) – Slovyansk
626(4) – Kramatorsk
6267 – Druzhkivka
6269 – Oleksandrivka
6272 – Kostyantynivka
6273 – Vuhledar
627(4) – Bakhmut
6275 – Dokuchayevsk
6277 – Dobropillya
6278 – Maryinka
6279 – Telmanove
629 – Mariupol
6296 – Novoazovsk
6297 – Manhush

64 – Luhansk Oblast
64(2) – Luhansk
642 – Oleksandrivsk
6431 – Antratsyt
6432 – Krasnyy Luch
6433 – Rovenky
6434 – Sverdlovsk
6435 – Krasnodon
6436 – Lutuhyne
6441 – Perevalsk
6442 – Alchevsk
6443 – Bryanka
6444 – Stakhanov
6445 – Novoaydar
6446 – Kirovsk
6451 – Lysychansk
6452 – Severodonetsk
6453 – Rubizhne
6454 – Kreminna
6455 – Pervomaysk
6456 – Troyitske
6461 – Starobilsk
6462 – Bilokurakene
6463 – Novopskov
6464 – Markivka
6465 – Milove
6466 – Bilovodsk
6471 – Svatove
6472 – Stantsyya Luhanska
6473 – Slovyanoserbsk
6474 – Popasna

65 – Crimea
65(2) – Simferopol
654 – Sovetske, Yalta
6550 – Nyzhnyohirskyy
6551 – Sovetskyy
6552 – Pervomayske
6553 – Rozdolne
6554 – Bakhchysaray
6555 – Kirovske
6556 – Krasnohvardiyske
6557 – Lenino
6558 – Chornomorske
6559 – Bilohirsk
6560 – Alushta
6561 – Kerch
6562 – Feodosiya
6563 – Saky
6564 – Dzhankoy
6565 – Krasnoperekopsk
6566 – Sudak
6567 – Armyansk
6569 – Yevpatoriya
Note: After annexation by Russia, Crimea switched to the Russian telephone codes +7 978 for mobile phones and +7 365 for landlines on 7 May 2015.

69 – Sevastopol
69 – Sevastopol
Note: After annexation by Russia, Crimea switched to the Russian telephone codes +7 978 for mobile phones and +7 869 for landlines at Sevastopol on 7 May 2015.

See also
Telephone numbers in Ukraine
Area codes

Notes

References

ITU allocations list

Ukraine
 
Ukraine communications-related lists